Julie Delpy (born 21 December 1969) is a French-American actress, film director, screenwriter, and singer-songwriter. She studied filmmaking at NYU's Tisch School of the Arts and has directed, written, and acted in more than 30 films, including Europa Europa (1990), Voyager (1991), Three Colors: White (1993), the Before trilogy (1995, 2004, 2013), An American Werewolf in Paris (1997), and 2 Days in Paris (2007).

She has been nominated for three César Awards, two Online Film Critics Society Awards, and two Academy Awards. She moved to the United States in 1990 and became a US citizen in 2001.

Family
Delpy was born in Paris, the only child of Albert Delpy, a Vietnamese-born French actor and theater director, and Marie Pillet, a French actress in feature films and the avant-garde theater. Her mother was also known for signing the 1971 Manifesto of the 343, signed by women demanding reproductive rights and admitting to having abortions when they were illegal in France. In Delpy's 2007 film 2 Days in Paris, her character's mother was played by her real mother and acknowledges signing the manifesto, mirroring her real life. Pillet died in 2009.

Julie's parents exposed her to the arts at an early age. She said:

Film career
In 1984, at fourteen, Delpy was discovered by film director Jean-Luc Godard, who cast her in Détective (1985). Two years later she played the title role in Bertrand Tavernier's La Passion Béatrice (1987) and was nominated for a César Award for Most Promising Actress. She used her money from the film to pay for her first trip to New York City. 
Delpy became an international celebrity after starring in the 1990 film Europa Europa directed by Agnieszka Holland. In the film, she plays a young pro-Nazi who falls in love with the hero, Solomon Perel, not knowing he is Jewish. She did not speak German, so she performed her role in English and her dialogue was dubbed in.

Delpy subsequently appeared in several Hollywood and European films, including Voyager (1991) and The Three Musketeers (1993). In 1993, she was cast by director Krzysztof Kieślowski for the female lead in Three Colors: White, the second film in Kieślowski's Three Colors Trilogy. She also appeared briefly in the other two films—Blue and Red—in the same role. That year, she also appeared with Brendan Fraser and Donald Sutherland in the Percy Adlon feature Younger and Younger. In 1994, she starred with Eric Stoltz in Roger Avary's directorial debut Killing Zoe, a cult heist film capturing the Generation X zeitgeist.
She achieved wider recognition for her role opposite Ethan Hawke in director Richard Linklater's Before Sunrise (1995), where she has controversially claimed to have written much of her own dialogue. It received glowing reviews and was considered one of the most significant films of the '90s independent film movement. Its success led to Delpy's casting in the 1997 American film An American Werewolf in Paris.

She reprised her Before Sunrise character, Céline, with a brief animated appearance in Waking Life (2001), and again in the sequels Before Sunset (2004) and Before Midnight (2013). The initial follow-up movie earned Delpy, who co-wrote the script, her first Academy Award nomination for Best Adapted Screenplay.

In late 2001, she appeared alongside comedian Martin Short in the 30-minute short film CinéMagique, a theatre-show attraction presented several times daily at Walt Disney Studios Park in Disneyland Paris. She attended the park's March 2002 opening and the inauguration of the film-based attraction, where she starred as Marguerite—a female actress with whom Short's character, George, falls in love as he stumbles through countless classic movies. CinéMagique won the 2002 Themed Entertainment Association award for Outstanding Themed Attraction.

In 2009, Delpy starred in The Countess as the title character Elizabeth Báthory. Her third film as a director, it also starred Daniel Brühl and William Hurt.

Writing and directing
Delpy began being interested in a film-directing career when still a child, and enrolled in a summer directing course at New York University. She wrote and directed the short film Blah Blah Blah in 1995 which screened at the Sundance Film Festival. In 2004, she co-wrote Before Sunset, a sequel to the 1995 movie Before Sunrise, with director Richard Linklater and co-star Ethan Hawke. Describing the experience, she said, "I'm not a feminist wearing overalls and hating the male gender. But I'm a definite feminist. I don't want to make Before Sunset into a little male fantasy, ever." She received an Academy Award nomination for Best Adapted Screenplay for her work on the film.
She made her feature length directorial debut in 2002 with Looking for Jimmy, which she also wrote and produced. In 2007 she directed, wrote, edited, and co-produced the original score for 2 Days in Paris, co-starring Adam Goldberg. It also features Delpy's real-life parents, Marie Pillet and Albert Delpy, as her character's parents.

In 2011 she wrote and directed Le Skylab, which received a theatrical release in France but failed to find distribution in the U.S. In 2012 she released 2 Days in New York, a sequel to her 2007 film 2 Days in Paris, starring Delpy and actor Chris Rock in a role she said she wrote specifically for him. In 2013, she reunited with Richard Linklater and Ethan Hawke to write Before Midnight, the sequel to Before Sunrise and Before Sunset. She again starred with Hawke, and the film premiered at the 2013 Sundance Film Festival. It screened out of competition at the Berlin International Film Festival and was released in May 2013. Delpy, Linklater and Hawke were later nominated for a Best Adapted Screenplay at the Academy Awards. Responding to criticism of the film's nudity, Delpy said in interview with GQ Magazine:

Some people were like, 'It's not feminist. You're showing your tits and he's not showing his ass.' [But] isn't it the people who are hiding women behind layers of clothes who are the misogynists? I'm a real person, so it's a statement to say, 'Alright, I'm a forty year-old woman, and this is what you get with no plastic surgery.'

Lolo was Delpy's second French-language feature film, and the first she'd directed since 2 Days in New York. She was also slated to write and direct the HBO movie Cancer Vixen, starring Cate Blanchett as Marisa Acocella Marchetto, a cartoonist for The New Yorker who is diagnosed with cancer. The project has yet to materialize as of 2020. In early 2014, Delpy announced her next writing-directing project would be A Dazzling Display of Splendor and focus on a family of vaudeville performers. It has also failed to enter production as of 2020.

Delpy courted controversy in 2016 when the Oscar nominations included no Black honorees. "Two years ago, I said something about the Academy being very white male, which is the reality, and I was slashed to pieces by the media ... It's funny—women can't talk. I sometimes wish I were African-American because people don't bash them afterward." She later apologized for the comment.

Music
Delpy is also a musical artist. Three tracks from her 2003 album Julie Delpy—"A Waltz For A Night," "An Ocean Apart," and "Je t'aime tant"—were featured in Before Sunset. She composed the original score for 2 Days in Paris in which she famously performed Marc Collin's "Lalala" over the closing credits. She also wrote the music for her 2009 film The Countess.

Personal life
Delpy moved to New York in 1990 and moved to Los Angeles a few years later. She has been a naturalized US citizen since 2001, although she also retains her French citizenship. She divides her time between Paris and Los Angeles. From 2007 to 2012 she was in a relationship with German film composer Marc Streitenfeld. Their son, Leo Streitenfeld, was born in January 2009.

In 2015 she married Dimitris Birbilis.

Delpy has expressed her commitment to correcting inaccurate assumptions regarding feminism, telling IndieWire "I'm very dedicated to feminism [but] even if I'm a feminist, I don't think all women are perfect. If we're equal to men, we are also imperfect like men ... [Some men] try to say [feminists] think that women are better than men, and I want to tell them, 'no'." In a 2007 interview with Jan Lisa Huttner, she said, "I was raised by a feminist, so I'm not a feminist. I don't need to be. I’m equal to men. I have no issues with the idea that I'm the same as a man. I have my differences; I have breasts, and different plumbing, different stuff down there. But outside of this, my consciousness, my capacity at creating, my capacity at doing things is the same as a man." However, in a 2012 interview with Emily Greenhouse in The New Yorker, she said, "You know, I've been raised by feminists, and I'm such a feminist, there's no way I'm not going to be feminist, because my core is so deeply feminist that I can even make sexist comments about women, and I feel still a feminist."

Delpy has said she has been plagued by health problems since childhood and had to wear callipers at age eight. She also occasionally experiences migraines and panic attacks.

Filmography

As actress

As filmmaker

Awards and nominations

References

External links

 
 
 

1969 births
20th-century French actresses
21st-century French actresses
21st-century American actresses
Actresses from Paris
American women singer-songwriters
American feminists
American film actresses
American film directors
American film score composers
American television actresses
American women film score composers
American women screenwriters
English-language singers from France
French emigrants to the United States
French women singers
French feminists
French film actresses
French film directors
French film score composers
French women film score composers
French women screenwriters
French screenwriters
French singer-songwriters
French television actresses
French women film directors
Feminist musicians
Living people
Musicians from Paris
Tisch School of the Arts alumni
Naturalized citizens of the United States